Failure is Assemblage 23's second album, released through Gashed! and, later, Metropolis Records in 2001. The album contains many energetic EBM songs led by emotionally charged lyrics. Most notably from this album came the single "Disappoint,"  released just before Metropolis' re-release of Failure. The album peaked at #2 on the CMJ RPM Charts in the U.S., ranking #31 overall for year 2001.

Track listing
All songs written, performed and produced by Tom Shear
 Naked (6:01)
 I am the Rain (6:40)
 House on Fire (4:55)
 Tried (6:23)
 Disappoint (5:33)
 Divide (6:01)
 Longevity (6:40)
 Silence (4:55)
 Awake (6:31)
 King of Insects (5:08)

References

2001 albums
Assemblage 23 albums
Accession Records albums
Metropolis Records albums